Phil Tomlinson was an American politician from the state of Oklahoma who served as the Oklahoma Secretary of Transportation from 2003 to 2009. Tomlinson served as Transportation Secretary under Governor of Oklahoma Brad Henry. In addition to serving as Transportation Secretary, Tomlinson served the Henry Administration as the Director of the Oklahoma Turnpike Authority from 2005 to 2009.

Biography
Tomlinson was a commercial real estate investor from Shawnee, Oklahoma. Prior to his service to Governor Henry, Tomlinson served in the administrations of Republican Governor Dewey F. Bartlett and Democratic Governor David Hall in various posts. He held a bachelor's degree in marketing and a master's degree in business administration, both from Oklahoma State University.
Tomlinson died in late March 2016.

Secretary of Transportation
In 2003, Governor of Oklahoma Brad Henry appointed Tomlinson to serve as his first Oklahoma Secretary of Transportation. As Transportation Secretary, Tomlinson oversaw all state transportation initiatives and the entities charged with implementing them, including the Oklahoma Department of Transportation, the Oklahoma Transportation Authority, the Oklahoma Aeronautics Commission, the Oklahoma Space Industry Development Authority and all Port Authorities within the state.

Position on NAFTA Superhighway
In 2007, Tomlinson told members of the Oklahoma Legislature that Oklahoma has not benefited much from being a member of the North American SuperCorridor Coalition (NASCO). Despite this, Tomlinson did recommend that Oklahoma should continue to participate in the organization, citing future investment as his reason. The state has been a member of NASCO since 1995.

Resignation from State services
Tomlinson resigned as Transportation Secretary in April 2009. Tomlinson, who said he would continue to serve as Director of the Turnpike Authority, resigned due to his desire to reduce his workload. Governor Henry appointed Gary Ridley, Director of the Oklahoma Department of Transportation, to succeed Tomlinson as Secretary.

In October, 2009, Tomlinson resigned as Director of the Transportation Authority effective November 1, 2009. The Authority appointed Gary Ridley to succeed Tomlinson as Director.

References

 

State cabinet secretaries of Oklahoma
Living people
Oklahoma State University alumni
Year of birth missing (living people)
Heads of Oklahoma state agencies
People from Shawnee, Oklahoma